The Living Matrix (Also Known As:Az élő mátrix) is a 2009 documentary film directed by Greg Becker. The film features Adam Dreamhealer, Arielle Essex, Peter Fraser, Bruce Lipton, Lynne McTaggart, Marilyn Schlitz and Edgar D. Mitchell.

References

External links
 
 

German documentary films
American documentary films
Greek documentary films
Dutch documentary films
2009 films
2009 documentary films
2000s English-language films
Edgar Mitchell
2000s American films
2000s German films